Vasile Botnaru (born 12 January 1957) is a journalist from the Republic of Moldova. He is the head of Radio Free Europe Chişinău.

Biography
Vasile Botnaru graduated from the Faculty of Journalism of Lomonosov Moscow State University. He has worked as photo reporter, secretary of the editorial board, and political commentator. Together with two colleagues, he founded the Basa Press News Agency in November 1992. He has contributed to the import of the Pro TV Television to Chişinău and is a correspondent for Associated Press.

Awards 
 Order of the Republic (Moldova) - highest state distinctions (2009)

References

External links 
 Vasile BOTNARU
 Biografia autorului

1957 births
Living people
Moldovan journalists
Male journalists
Moscow State University alumni
People from Rezina District
Radio Free Europe/Radio Liberty people
Recipients of the Order of the Republic (Moldova)